The 2007 Barcelona KIA was a tennis tournament played on outdoor clay courts. It was the first edition of the Barcelona Ladies Open as part of the WTA Tour and was part of the WTA Tier IV tournaments of the 2007 WTA Tour. It was held in Barcelona, Spain, from 11 June through 17 June 2007.

Points and prize money

Point distribution

Prize money

* per team

Singles main draw entrants

Seeds

Other entrants 

The following players received wildcards into the singles main draw:
  Nuria Llagostera Vives
  Conchita Martínez Granados
  Laura Pous Tió

The following players received entry from the qualifying draw:
  Gréta Arn
  Ekaterina Dzehalevich 
  María Emilia Salerni
  Ágnes Szávay

Retirements
  Iveta Benešová (right lumbar dysfunction)
  Romina Oprandi (right arm bruise)

Doubles main draw entrants

Seeds

Other entrants 
The following pairs received wildcards into the doubles main draw:
  Laura Pous Tió /  Carla Suárez Navarro

Champions

Singles 

 Meghann Shaughnessy def.  Edina Gallovits, 6–3, 6–2

Doubles 

 Nuria Llagostera Vives /  Arantxa Parra Santonja def.  Lourdes Domínguez Lino /  Flavia Pennetta, 7–6(7–3), 2–6, [12–10]

References

External links 
Barcelona KIA website
Singles Main and Qualifying Draws, Doubles Main Draw

Barcelona WTA
Tennis Barcelona KIA
Barcelona Ladies Open
Bar